Under English law, exchanging contracts is the final step in a house purchase, occurring after a solicitor has carried out all necessary searches and there is agreement to the contract terms. Once each party has signed the contracts and they have been exchanged, they are binding.
 
The contracts will include a completion date, which is the date that the property becomes acquired by the purchaser. At exchange of contracts, any deposit needed has to be paid, and arrangements for building insurance must be made so that the property is insured from that day. Usually, the present insurer will cover this new property free of increased premium until the completion date.

This is a system that only occurs under English law, and the exchange of contracts can occur many weeks or months after a sale offer has been agreed in principle. This contrasts with most countries where the house sale becomes legally binding very quickly.

References 

Real property law
Housing in England
English law